Maura McLaughlin Ph.D. is currently an astrophysics professor at West Virginia University in Morgantown, West Virginia. She holds a Bachelor's of Science degree from Pennsylvania State University and a Ph.D. from Cornell University.  She is known for her work on furthering the research on gravitational waves and for her dedication to the Pulsar Search Collaboratory. She was named a Fellow of the American Physical Society in 2021.

Early life and education 
McLaughlin grew up in Oreland, Pennsylvania.

She received a Bachelor's of Science degree in Astronomy and Astrophysics from the Pennsylvania State University in 1994. She obtained a Ph.D. in Astronomy and Space Sciences from Cornell University in 2001. McLaughlin is currently a professor in Astronomy and Physics at West Virginia University. McLaughlin is married to Duncan Lorimer, a physics professor also at West Virginia University, with whom she has three children.

Work 
McLaughlin is chair of the North American Nanohertz Observatory for Gravitational Waves (NANOGrav) collaboration. The team was originally funded by a 6.5 million dollar award given to them by the National Science Foundation as part of the Partnerships for International Research and Education (PIRE) program and is now an NSF Physics Frontier Center. McLaughlin was also fundamental in the discovery of the double-pulsar system as well as in the discovery of several new pulsars. McLaughlin dedicates her time to the Pulsar Search Collaboratory located in Green Bank, West Virginia. The Pulsar Search Collaboratory involves high school students in a collaborative effort with the National Radio Astronomy Observatory (NRAO) to further information and discover new pulsars.

McLaughlin conducts her research on pulsars using the Green Bank Telescope and the Arecibo Observatory.

Awards 

 Cottrell Scholar Award
 Alfred P. Sloan Fellowship
 PIRE Program Award
Fellow of the American Physical Society

References

Year of birth missing (living people)
Living people
Women astrophysicists
American astrophysicists
West Virginia University faculty
Pennsylvania State University alumni
Cornell University alumni
Fellows of the American Physical Society